Madar-e-Soleyman Rural District is a rural district in Hakhamanish District, Pasargad County, Fars Province, Iran. At the 2006 census, its population was 3,720, in 886 families.  The rural district has 7 villages.

References 

Rural Districts of Fars Province
Pasargad County